Xylokastro–Evrostina is a municipality in the Corinthia regional unit, Peloponnese, Greece. The seat of the municipality is the town Xylokastro. The municipality has an area of 411.667 km2.

Municipality
The municipality Xylokastro–Evrostina was formed at the 2011 local government reform by the merger of the following 2 former municipalities, that became municipal units:
Evrostina
Xylokastro

References

Municipalities of Peloponnese (region)
Populated places in Corinthia